Casselman railway station is located on St. Joseph Street in the village of Casselman, Ontario, Canada. It is an optional station stop on the Via Rail Toronto-Ottawa-Montreal Corridor line for two trains a day in each direction. Both westbound trains arrive from Montreal and continue towards Ottawa, Kingston, and Toronto. The first eastbound train arrives from Toronto, Kingston, and Ottawa and continues towards Montreal, while the second eastbound train arrives from Ottawa only and continues to Montreal.

The station is wheelchair accessible.

Railway services
As of September 2020, Casselman station is served by 1 domestic route (with connections) provided by Via Rail, the primary passenger rail operator in Canada. Departures have been reduced to 4 trains per day due to the coronavirus pandemic (effective September 1, 2020).

Ottawa - Quebec

Quebec / Montreal - Ottawa 

 No local service between Québec City, Sainte-Foy and Charny, or Saint-Lambert and Montréal.

See also
 List of designated heritage railway stations of Canada

References

External links

Via Rail stations in Ontario
Buildings and structures in the United Counties of Prescott and Russell
Canadian National Railway stations in Ontario
Designated heritage railway stations in Ontario